Dirr may refer to:

Michael Dirr, American horticulturist
Dirr's Trees and Shrubs for Warm Climates, sometimes abbreviated Dirr or Dirr's; see List of horticulture and gardening books/publications
Otillie Dirr, a founder of the Sisters of St. Francis of Assisi
dirr, an abbreviation for dwarf irregular galaxy

See also
Dir (disambiguation)
Durr (disambiguation)
Duerr (disambiguation)